The Snipex Alligator is a bolt-action, magazine-fed anti-materiel rifle chambered in 14.5×114mm manufactured by XADO Holding Ltd.

Design
The Snipex Alligator long-range large-caliber magazine-fed repeating rifle is designed to engage moving and stationary targets: vehicles, communications and air defense systems, aircraft in parking areas, fortified fixed defensive positions, dugouts, etc. The box magazine is detachable and holds five rounds of ammunition.

The rifle was designed to take into account all the requirements for high-precision shooting. Barrel locking is achieved through a rotating bolt. The rifle demonstrates an acceptable level of recoil during shooting. Recoil is suppressed by the muzzle brake, the recoil isolator, an elastic multilayer shoulder pad, and optimally balanced weight.

The rifle has a height-adjustable cheek rest, which can be positioned for right- or left-handed shooting. For ease of aiming, the rifle is equipped with a folding bipod and an adjustable rear support, allowing for fine adjustment. It has a Picatinny rail with a 35 arc minute gradient on which various sighting devices can be mounted.

History
The Alligator rifle was first introduced in June 2020 on the official Snipex Facebook page. In July, the first presentation video appeared on the official YouTube channel of XADO. Based on the state examinations results, the 14.5×114 mm caliber Snipex Alligator rifle was unofficially adopted by the Armed Forces of Ukraine in 2020; it was officially adopted on 2 March 2021.

The Alligator has been used by Ukrainian forces during the 2022 Russian invasion of Ukraine. A record killing shot was recorded there in November 2022 at a confirmed distance of 2710 meters.

Users
: Armed Forces of Ukraine

See also
Snipex T-Rex
Snipex M
Snipex Rhino Hunter
Istiglal anti-materiel rifle

References

14.5×114mm anti-materiel rifles
Single-shot bolt-action rifles
Rifles of Ukraine